Oskar Thierbach (11 February 1909 – 6 November 1991) was a German professional road bicycle racer. In the 1930s, he was one of the best German road racers, finishing in the top 10 of the Tour de France twice.

Major results

1932
Tour de France:
7th General Classification
1934
Winner of the Harzrundfahrt:
1935
Tour de France:
10th General Classification

References

External links
Oskar Thierbach's profile on Cycling Ranking

1909 births
1991 deaths
Cyclists from Dresden
People from the Kingdom of Saxony
German male cyclists